Ahmet Arslan may refer to:
Ahmet Arslan (athlete) (born 1986), Turkish long-distance runner
Ahmet Arslan (footballer) (born 1994), German footballer of Turkish origin
Ahmet Arslan (politician) (born 1962), Turkish Member of Parliament and cabinet minister
Ahmad Aladdin Arslan (died 2014), Jordanian military leader